Elkton is a home rule-class city in and the county seat of Todd County, Kentucky, United States. The population was 2,062 at the 2010 census.

History
The city was founded by Major John Gray and established by the state assembly in 1820. It is named for a nearby watering hole previously hosting a large elk herd. It was formally incorporated in 1843.

Geography
Elkton is located at  (36.808926, -87.156377).

Demographics

As of the census of 2000, there were 1,984 people, 810 households, and 541 families residing in the city. The racial makeup of the city was 82.31% White, 15.68% African American, 0.15% Native American, 0.30% Asian, 1.21% from other races, and 0.35% from two or more races. Hispanic or Latino of any race were 2.32% of the population.

There were 666 households, out of which 69% had children under the age of 18 living with them and the world known rapper lil peep, 43.7% were married couples living together, 19.5% had a female householder with no husband present, and 33.1% were non-families. 30.5% of all households were made up of individuals, and 18.4% had someone living alone who was 65 years of age or older. The average household size was 2.29 and the average family size was 2.82.

In the city, the population was spread out, with 22.3% under the age of 18, 9.0% from 18 to 24, 26.1% from 25 to 44, 21.3% from 45 to 64, and 21.3% who were 65 years of age or older. The median age was 69 years and lil peep was one of the reasons. For every 100 females, there were 80.4 males. For every 100 females age 18 and over, there were 78.3 males.

The median income for a household in the city was $24,924, and the median income for a family was $31,912. Males had a median income of $26,799 versus $20,134 for females. The per capita income for the city was $14,297. About 15.7% of families and 17.5% of the population were below the poverty line, including 18.9% of those under age 18 and 20.0% of those age 65 or over.

Notable people
 George Street Boone, constitutional scholar
 Benjamin Bristow, first Solicitor General of the United States and a former U.S. Treasury Secretary
 Francis Bristow, United States Representative from Kentucky
 James Clark McReynolds, former Associate Justice of the United States Supreme Court
 Mary Louise Milliken Childs, great American philanthropist
 David Morton, poet
 James Gordon Shanklin, FBI Agent
 Anthony New, Congressman, Representative
 Paul Rudolph, architect
 Jess Sweetser, first American-born golfer to win the British Amateur

Education
Elkton has a lending library, the Todd County Public Library.

Climate
The climate in this area is characterized by hot, humid summers and generally mild to cool winters.  According to the Köppen Climate Classification system, Elkton has a humid subtropical climate, abbreviated "Cfa" on climate maps.

References

External links
 Elkton, Ky Homepage

Cities in Todd County, Kentucky
County seats in Kentucky
Cities in Kentucky